Brennania is a genus of flies in family Tabanidae. It was originally known as Comops, created as a subgenus of Apatolestes by Brennan (1935). Philip (1941) then raised it to genus level, but renamed it to Brennania (as it was preoccupied by Comops Aldrich, 1934).

Species
The genus contains the following species:
 Brennania belkini (Philip, 1966) – Belkin's Dune Tabanid Fly
 Brennania hera (Osten Sacken, 1877)

References

Tabanidae
Taxa named by Cornelius Becker Philip
Diptera of North America
Brachycera genera